Gogmagog were a British hard rock and heavy metal supergroup based in Chipping Barnet formed in the 1980s, assembled in 1985 by the record producer Jonathan King. The band's lineup featured former Iron Maiden vocalist Paul Di'Anno and drummer Clive Burr, former Gillan and future Iron Maiden guitarist Janick Gers, former Def Leppard guitarist Pete Willis, and former Whitesnake bassist Neil Murray.

Together for only a short time, Gogmagog originally released a three song E.P. on the small independent Food For Thought label in 1985 entitled I Will Be There. Two of the songs recorded were written by producer King ("Living in a Fucking Time Warp" and "It's Illegal, It's Immoral, It's Unhealthy, But It's Fun"), with the title track being composed by longtime KISS collaborator Russ Ballard, and originally released on his 1981 solo album Into the Fire. Ballard wrote several huge hit songs including Rainbow's Since You've Been Gone and Santana's Winning. The band members did not write any original material.

Originally, King attempted to put together a supergroup revolving around Whitesnake vocalist David Coverdale, bassist John Entwistle of The Who, and veteran drummer Cozy Powell, all of whom were keen on the project. Cozy Powell said he thought the Ballard song was "the best he's ever written". Entwistle was very excited - the concept was originally his idea - but this early line-up "wasn't working out" according to Di'Anno. Being little more than a contrivance concocted by producer Jonathan King, the band quickly fell apart once he lost interest. Vocalist Di'Anno was completely dismissive of both the group and producer, referring to the failed project as "...nothing. That was some fucking idiot who got us doing that shit." But drummer Clive Burr said "the others may not admit it but this is some of the best stuff any of us has done". He predicted it would sell more than Iron Maiden ever did. It didn't.

But it has become a cult classic for rock fans and the tracks are being released in the winter of 2022 as a 13 minute medley and an example of OWO - Old Wave Of British Heavy Metal.

The two King-penned songs appeared in the soundtrack to the 2011 film Me Me Me, also written by King.  On some websites, the original members of the band are listed as appearing in the cast; however, the band Falling Red were recruited to perform as Gogmagog in the film.

Personnel

Former members
Paul Di'Anno – lead vocals
Pete Willis – guitars
Janick Gers – guitars 
Neil Murray – bass
Clive Burr – drums, percussion

Discography
I Will Be There EP (1985)
"I Will Be There" – 4:35 (Russ Ballard)
"Living in a Fucking Time Warp" – 3:14 (Jonathan King)
"It's Illegal, It's Immoral, It's Unhealthy, but It's Fun" – 3:30 (King)

References

English hard rock musical groups
Iron Maiden (band)
Musical groups established in 1985
Musical groups disestablished in 1985
Musical groups from London
British supergroups
Rock music supergroups
1985 establishments in England